Swannington is a former mining village situated between Coalville and Ashby-de-la-Zouch, Leicestershire, England. A document of 1520 mentions five pits at Swannington. It was a terminus of the early (1832) Leicester and Swannington Railway that was built to carry away chcvdidvdvdopened in 1825 to serve the townships of Swannington and Thringstone and is built on a spot reputedly chosen by William Wordsworth, a frequent guest of Sir George Beaumont (the 8th Baronet, 1799–1845) of nearby Coleorton Hall. It is possible that the dedication of the church to Saint George is derived from its association with this George Beaumont.

A windmill in Swannington called Hough Mill was built near a nature reserve established on the remains of Califat colliery (a 19th-century mine). It has been claimed as the birthplace of Robin Hood.

Administratively, Swannington is a civil parish forming part of the district of North West Leicestershire in Coalville. The population of the civil parish at the 2011 census was 1,270. Nearby villages and hamlets include Whitwick, Coleorton, Thringstone, Ravenstone, Gelsmoor, Peggs Green and Sinope.

References

External links

Swannington Heritage Trust

Villages in Leicestershire
Civil parishes in Leicestershire
North West Leicestershire District